Ajoka Theatre (Urdu: , literal translation of Ajoka: "today/present") is a Pakistani not-for-profit arts organization based in Lahore, Punjab, with focus on producing and performing social theatrical stage productions, founded in 1984. The group was formed by director, actress and playwright, Madeeha Gauhar at peak of the tensions during the state of emergency under the regime of General Muhammad Zia-ul-Haq. Ajoka Theatre received the prestigious Prince Claus Award in 2006 and the International Theatre Pasta Award in 2007.

Since its inception, the group have staged many popular society critical pieces in theatres, on the streets and in public spaces, as well as in productions for television and on video. Ajoka Theatre has not only performed in Pakistan, but has also in the South Asian region, in countries like India, Bangladesh, Nepal and Sri Lanka, as well as in Europe and United States of America. The group focuses on promotion of a just, humane, secular and equal society, alongside the subject of women's rights in a society that is greatly dominated by men.

The group's first ever theatrical performance was Jaloos (Procession) written by veteran Indian playwright Badal Sarkar. The style of Ajoka's performances can be characterised as an elaboration on the oral tradition of Bhand and Nautanki that found a flourishing base in the area that currently overlaps the province of Punjab. In spite of the Western education of Gauhar, she does not limit herself to classical Western theatre techniques. Instead, she mixes authentic Pakistani elements, combining it with contemporary sentiments.

History
Gauhar was born in 1956 in Karachi. After she obtained a Master of Arts degree in English literature, she moved to England where she obtained another master's degree, in theatre sciences at the University of London. In 1983, after returning to Lahore, Gauhar and her husband Shahid Nadeem founded Ajoka Theatre, the first theatre group of significance there. 
 
In 2007, Ajoka performed a piece that was written and directed by Gauhar, called Burqavaganza (Burqa-vaganza), which led to great controversy. Actors dressed in burkas put themes on the stage like sexual discrimination, intolerance and fanaticism. From a Western perspective, the piece was a rather innocent performance on hypocrisy of a society that bathes in corruption. In her own country though, Members of Parliament called for a ban of it, and the Minister of Culture threatened with sanctions when it would be staged any longer. In spite of the ban, non-governmental organisations and women's rights activists had the theatre piece translated into English and staged performances internationally as a sign of support to Ajoka.

On 23 August 2008, Alhamra Arts Council hosted the launch of Selected Plays published by Oxford University Press (OUP) and written by Shahid Nadeem with the help of Ajoka. The book contains seven of his famous plays Teesri Dastak, Barri, Aik Thi Nani, Kala Meda Bhes, Dukhini, Bulha and Burqavaganza. The book again launched at the Pakistan National Council of the Arts (PNCA), Islamabad on 25 August 2008 with the help of Pakistan Academy of Letters. His book, Selected Plays, a collection of his six famous plays in an English translation was published by OUP in August 2008. Two collections of his Urdu and Punjabi plays has been published.

In 2012, Nadeem wrote a play Kaun Hai Yeh Gustakh, directed by Madeeha Gauhar and first played at Alhamra Arts Council, Lahore on 14 December by Ajoka. The play is based on the life of Saadat Hassan Manto, and was well received by audiences. Manto was played by Naseem Abbas. In January 2013 the play was presented at the Akshara Theatre in New Delhi, India. The play was due to be presented at the National School of Drama (NSD) in New Delhi but was cancelled due to security concerns. In February 2013, play was held at Nishtar Hall, Peshawar by Ajoka.

Productions 
Ajoka Theatre has staged several theatrical performances, mostly all plays have been adapted or written by Madeeha Gauhar and Shahid Nadeem.

 1984: Jaloos, by Badal Sarkar
 1985: Chalk Chakkar, by Bertolt Brecht
 1987: Barri, by Shahid Nadeem
 1987: Marya Hoya Kutta, by Shahid Nadeem
 1988: Itt, by Shahid Nadeem
 1989: Choolah, by Shahid Nadeem
 1990: Jhali Kithay Jaway, by Shahid Nadeem
 1991: Teesri Dastak, by Shahid Nadeem
 1992: Lappar, by Shahid Nadeem
 1992: Toba Tek Singh, by Saadat Hassan Manto
 1992: Dekh Tamasha Chaltha Ban, by Shahid Nadeem
 1993: Aik Thee Naani, by Shahid Nadeem
 1994: Kali Ghata: Acting for Nature by WWF Pakistan
 1994: Talismati Tota, by Shahid Nadeem
 1995: Jum Jum Jeevay Jaman Pura, by Shahid Nadeem 
 1996: Kala Mainda Bhes, by Madeeha Gauhar
 1997: Dukhini, by Shahid Nadeem
 1998: Bala King, by Bertolt Brecht
 2000: Adhoori, by Kishwar Naheed, Fehmida Riaz and Ishrat Afreen
 2001: Chal Melay Nu Chaliay, by Shahid Nadeem
 2001: Bullah, by Shahid Nadeem 
 2004: Mainoon Kari Kareenday Ni Mae, by Shahid Nadeem
 2004: Piro Preman, by Dr. Swarajbir
 2004: Shehr-e-Afsos, by Intezar Hussain
 2005: Border, Border, by Shahid Nadeem
 2006: Dukh Darya, by Shahid Nadeem
 2006: Dushman, by Shahid Nadeem
 2006: Maon Kay Naam, by Saadat Hasan Manto
 2007: Surkh Gulaaba'n Da Mausam, by Mazhar Tirmazi
 2007: Burqavaganza, by Shahid Nadeem
 2008: Hotel Mohenjodaro, by Ghulam Abbas 
 2009: Raja Rasalu, by Malik Aslam
 2010: Dara, by Shahid Nadeem
 2011: The Dreams Can Come True, by Shahid Nadeem
 2011: Mera Rang De Basanti Chola, by Madeeha Gauhar
 2011: Amrika Chalo, by Shahid Nadeem
 2012: Rozan-E-Zindan Se, by Shahid Nadeem
 2012: Kaun Hai Yeh Gustakh, by Shahid Nadeem
 2014: Lo Phir Basant Ayee, by Shahid Nadeem
 2015: Kaun Bane Ga Badshah, by Shahid Nadeem
 2016: Kabeera Khara Bazar Mai, by Shahid Nadeem
 2016: Anhi Mai Da Sufna, by Shahid Nadeem
 2017: Intezaar, by Shahid Nadeem
 2018: Chairing Cross, by Shahid Nadeem

References

Bibliography

Literature

External links 

Theatre in Pakistan
Theatre companies in Pakistan
Arts centres in Pakistan
Arts organizations established in 1984
Urdu theatre
1984 establishments in Pakistan
Organisations based in Lahore
Lahore
Culture in Lahore
Performing groups established in 1984
Entertainment in Pakistan